Nuytsland Nature Reserve is a protected area of Western Australia in the south-eastern part of the state, on the south coast.

Geography
Nominally located at 32° 18' S 125° 52' E, it has an area of 6,253.44 km², and takes in over 500 kilometres of coastline from Cape Pasley to Red Rocks Point.

In the southwest the reserve includes the Israelite Plain, a coastal plain with broad beaches, dunes, sandplains, and coastal lagoons which includes Israelite Bay. The middle section of the reserve protects the Baxter Cliffs, dramatic seacliffs that extend up to 80 metres high for over 190 km along the coast. The Baxter Cliffs feature Toolinna Cove and Twilight Cove. The reserve boundary extends northwards near Cocklebiddy to encompass Cocklebiddy Cave on the Hampton Tableland. The eastern end of the reserve includes the western portion of the Roe Plains, with extensive coastal dunes and sandplains. Eyre Bird Observatory is located near Cocklebiddy, where the cliffs transition to the Roe Plains.

At the reserve's western end it adjoins Cape Arid National Park. Ngadju Indigenous Protected Area bounds the western portion of the reserve on the north.

Flora and fauna
Plant communities include heath on the western coastal plains and headlands, woodlands and mallee dominated by eucalypts, and bluebush (Maireana spp.) shrublands in the east. 

The reserve has been surveyed for the western ground parrot (Pezoporus flaviventris).

Conservation
The reserve was gazetted in 1969 and named for the Nuyts cadastral division within which it lies, named in honor of the infamous Pieter Nuyts, the highest ranking member of the Dutch East India Company aboard the 't Gulden Zeepaert when it mapped the southwestern Australian coast, after which it was sometimes known as Nuytsland.

Climate

References

External link
 Nuytsland Nature Reserve, Parks and Wildlife Service, Government of Western Australia

 
Nature reserves in Western Australia
Goldfields-Esperance
Nullarbor Plain
South coast of Western Australia
Hampton bioregion
Great Australian Bight